The  is in the northeast corner of Ueno Park in Tokyo. The museum has exhibitions on pre-Meiji science in Japan. It is the venue of the taxidermied bodies of the legendary dogs Hachikō and Taro and Jiro. A life-size blue whale model and a steam locomotive are also on display outside.

History

Opened in 1871, it has had several names, including Ministry of Education Museum, Tokyo Museum, Tokyo Science Museum, the National Science Museum of Japan, and the National Museum of Nature and Science as of 2007. It was renovated in the 1990s and 2000s, and offers a wide variety of natural history exhibitions and interactive scientific experiences.

It was completed as the main building of the Tokyo Science Museum in September 1931 as part of the reconstruction project after the Great Kanto Earthquake. Neo-Renaissance style. Designed by Kenzo Akitani, an engineer of the Ministry of Education, Culture, Sports, Science and Technology, Building Division. The building is the most visited museum in Japan, and looks like an airplane when viewed from above. In addition to the exhibition hall, it has facilities such as a dome for astronomical observation and an auditorium.

It is designed to withstand earthquakes of the Great Kanto Earthquake class, and it is said that there is no problem in light of the current Building Standards Act standards.

In 2021, the museum organized the Pokémon Fossil Museum, a travelling exhibition based on the Pokémon franchise, in collaboration with The Pokémon Company. The exhibition opened at the Mikasa City Museum in Mikasa, Hokkaido, Japan, on 4 July 2021, and remained there until 20 September. It has since been hosted by several other museums across Japan, including the National Museum of Nature and Science, which hosted it from 15 March to 19 June 2022. A virtual tour of the exhibit as it appeared in the museum was also made available online.

Exhibition buildings

Nihonkan (Japan Gallery)
The theme of the Ueno Main Building is "Aiming for the coexistence of humankind and nature," and consists of two exhibition halls, the Japan Pavilion and the Earth Pavilion.

Chikyūkan (Global Gallery)
The theme is "History of Earth Life and Mankind". The exhibition area is 3 floors above ground and 3 floors below ground. The first phase of construction was completed in 1998. The permanent exhibition will be open to the public from April 24, the following year. Grand opening on November 2, 2004 after the completion of the second phase of construction. The renovation work of the north exhibition hall started in September 2014, and the construction was completed the following year, and the grand opening was held on July 14.

National research facility
Museum research facility
 Tsukuba Botanical Garden
Other National research facilities
 Ueno Zoo
 Tama Zoo
 Tokyo Sea Life Park

Access
        Ueno Station
   Uguisudani Station
  Keisei Ueno Station

See also

Institute for Nature Study
Hachikō
List of museums
National Science Museum (disambiguation)
Tokyo National Museum
Hisako Koyama

References

External links

 National Museum of Nature and Science - official site in English
 National Museum of Nature and Science on Google Cultural Institute

Ueno Park
Museums in Tokyo
Science museums in Japan
National museums of Japan
Natural history museums in Japan
Museums established in 1871
1871 establishments in Japan
Buildings and structures in Taitō
Neoclassical architecture in Japan
Art Deco architecture in Japan